Pavlivka may refer to places in Ukraine:
Pavlivka, Luhansk Oblast, an urban-type settlement
Pavlivka, Volnovakha Raion, a village in Donetsk Oblast
Pavlivka, Volyn Oblast, a rural locality
 Pavlivka, a village in Ivano-Frankivsk Oblast
 , a village in the Stepanivka rural hromada, Odesa Oblast

See also
 Pavel, a name
 Pavlovka (disambiguation)